Faye Deborah White,  (born 2 February 1978) is an English former footballer who captained Arsenal Women in the FA Women's Super League and is the longest-serving female captain of England to date. Her Lionesses career spanned 15 years and five major tournament finals - a record four as captain. A UEFA Women's Champions League winner, she won both League titles and the FA Cup across three different decades with Arsenal. White was recognised for services to Sport in the Queen's New Year's Honours List 2007, being appointed a Member of the Order of the British Empire In recognition of her achievements she was inducted into the English Football Hall of Fame in 2015.

Club career
White began playing football at the age of ten, when she joined in the training sessions of her brother's team Horley Town. After three years of playing with her brother and his teammates she decided to go to an all-girls coaching session, at which she met Jim Muir, the coach of a local girls' side Horsham Ladies. She began playing for the reserves before becaming a first-team player at the age of 14. While still at Horsham, aged 16, White was called up for the national team by Ted Copeland.

In the 1996–97 season White was tapped up by Vic Akers and Arsenal Ladies, and earned her first international cap against Scotland. White broke into the first team, cementing a position at the heart of Arsenal's central defence. She collected her first trophy that year, the FA Women's Premier League.

In 1997–98, due to White's performances in north London she was named the Premier League Player of the Year. Arsenal won the FA Women's Cup and Premier League Cup.

White achieved major success despite suffering numerous injuries including two cruciate ligament injuries, which kept her out of football for nine months each time. During her career she amassed 31 major trophies at club competition level, winning the inaugural FA Women's Super League in 2011, the FA Women's Premier League 10 times (including seven consecutive years from 2003–04 to 2009–10), the FA Women's Cup nine times and the League Cup six times. 

While White was captain, Arsenal won "The Quadruple" (UEFA Women's Champions League, Premier League, FA Cup, League Cup), two "Trebles" (all three major domestic competitions) and four "Doubles" (League title & FA Cup). The club went 108 league games undefeated between 2003 and 2009 and won 51 consecutive league matches between 2006 and 2008. The UEFA Women's Champions League victory in 2007 remains the only victory by an English team in the major European competition since the tournament's inception.

International career
White made her England debut against Scotland in 1997, aged 19, followed by her full debut against France in 1998 when she was named player of the match. White went on to represent her country in her first major tournament at UEFA Euro 2001 in Germany.

In 2002, she was named by Hope Powell as England captain against Nigeria, during the qualification campaign for FIFA World Cup in USA. White was to keep the armband until her international retirement in 2012.

She led the Lionesses at UEFA Euro 2005 in England, 2007 FIFA Women's World Cup in China, UEFA Euro 2009 in Finland and 2011 FIFA Women's World Cup in Germany.

At the Quarter Final stage of the 2007 World Cup vs USA in Tianjin, White's nose was broken by an elbow from Abby Wambach ten minutes before half time. White played the remaining duration of the game with the injury, making several vital headed clearances, but was unable to prevent a World Cup exit to the top ranked national team in the world.

In 2009, in her third major championship finals as captain, White led England to the final of Euro 2009 in Helsinki, Finland, where the team lost out to reigning World and European Champions, Germany. She wore a protective face mask in the final after breaking her cheekbone in the quarter-final win over Finland in Turku, just six days after having surgery.

In the 2011 FIFA Women's World Cup Quarter Final penalty shoot-out versus France at the BayArena, Leverkusen, White missed England's fifth penalty, seeing the French win 4–3 and progress to the semi-finals.

White was one of the first female players to be given a central contract by The Football Association and also served as an ambassador for England's 2018 World Cup bid.

In April 2012, just prior to the announcement of the Great Britain squad for the upcoming Olympic tournament, White, while still recovering from knee surgery, announced her pregnancy and made the decision to retire from international football.

International goals
Scores and results list England's goal tally first.

Honours

International - England 

UEFA Women's Championship: Runner Up.
2009.
FIFA Player of the Match: vs Germany, FIFA World Cup 2007, Group A.
Carlsberg Player of the Match: vs Sweden, UEFA Euro 2009, Group C.

Domestic - Arsenal LFC 

UEFA Women's Champions League: 1
2006–07
FA Women's Super League: 1
2011
 FA Women's Premier League National Division: 10
1996–97, 2000–01, 2001–02, 2003–04, 2004–05, 2005–06, 2006–07, 2007–08, 2008–09, 2009–10
FA Women's Cup: 9
1997-1998, 1998-1999, 2000-01, 2003–04, 2005–06, 2006–07, 2007–08, 2008–09, 2010–11
FA Women's Premier League Cup: 6
1997–98, 1998–99, 1999–00, 2000–01, 2004–05, 2008–09
FA Women's Community Shield: 4
1999-00, 2001–02, 2004–05, 2005–06

Individual
FA Women's Player's Player of the Year: 1
1997–98

Retirement
In April 2012, White announced that she was expecting her first child and was retiring from international football. In March 2013, she announced her retirement from her playing career after 17 years as a professional.

Media work 

White appears regularly as co-commentator and studio pundit on television and radio for the BBC, BT Sport, SKY Sports, FATV, ESPN, Eurosport and Radio 5 Live.

Non-playing career
White was awarded an honorary degree by the University of Hertfordshire in November 2013.

White acted as the Ambassador for the 2012-13 UEFA Women's Champions League Final in London. She is also an ambassador for the sporting charity Football Foundation.

She was a marketing officer for Arsenal LFC in the FA WSL and is a qualified sports massage therapist.

Personal life
White was born and grew up in Horley, Surrey and attended Horley Infants School, Yattendon Middle School Horley and Oakwood School, Horley.

She attended Reigate College, and later returned to open the new sports centre in 2010.

She has two sons, Lukas, born in 2012 and Jake, born in 2016.

References

External links

 
Arsenal profile of Faye White
Faye White at the National Football Museum Hall of Fame
FA profile of Faye White 

1978 births
Living people
People from Horley
English association football commentators
English women's footballers
England women's international footballers
Women's association football central defenders
Arsenal W.F.C. players
Members of the Order of the British Empire
English Football Hall of Fame inductees
FA Women's National League players
Expatriate women's soccer players in Canada
Women's Super League players
2011 FIFA Women's World Cup players
2007 FIFA Women's World Cup players
Ottawa Fury (women) players
USL W-League (1995–2015) players
English expatriate sportspeople in Canada